The Progressive Conservative Party of Nova Scotia (formerly Progressive Conservative Association of Nova Scotia), is a moderate political party in Nova Scotia, Canada. Like most conservative parties in Atlantic Canada, it has been historically associated with the Red Tory faction of Canadian conservatism. The party is currently led by Pictou East MLA Tim Houston. The party won a majority government in the 2021 provincial election.

History
The Progressive Conservative Association of Nova Scotia, registered under the Nova Scotia Elections Act as the Progressive Conservative Party of Nova Scotia, originated from the Confederation Party of Charles Tupper. Tupper united members of the pre-Confederation Conservative Party (who were predominantly United Empire Loyalists and members of the business elite) and supporters of Sir John A. Macdonald's national Conservative coalition. The party supported Macdonald's protectionist National Policy, nation-building, and the unification of British North America.

Canadian Confederation was initially unpopular in Nova Scotia, and the party was out of government for most of the late 19th century. It formed government for only six years between 1867 and 1956. It bottomed out in 1945, when the party was shut out of the legislature altogether.

The modern party was built by Robert Stanfield after World War II. Stanfield, the scion of a wealthy textile family, had considered himself socialist in university; though he later moderated his views, he always remained a progressive. Under his leadership, what was by then the "Progressive Conservative Party" became a moderate Red Tory organization. He was able to get the party back into the House of Assembly soon after taking the leadership. By 1956, he had built it into an organization that was able to sweep to power, winning re-election four times.

As premier, he led reforms in human rights, education, municipal government and health care and also created Industrial Estates Limited, a crown corporation that successfully attracted investment from world companies such as Michelin Tire. He worked to modernized the road system, brought in the first form of Medicare, established the first economic development agency, invested heavily in education at all levels and established the predecessor to the Nova Scotia Community College.

After Stanfield left provincial politics to become leader of the federal Progressive Conservative Party in 1967, G. I. Smith served as premier until 1970. After being elected party leader in 1971, John Buchanan was elected premier in 1978. He was re-elected in 1981, 1984 and 1988. In the 1984 election, voters served his largest majority, capturing 42 of the 52 seats in the legislature. Buchanan's government first succeeded in convincing federal government to give Nova Scotia control over offshore resources such as gas and oil, resulting in future revenue for the province through the Crown Share.

Roger Bacon became premier in 1990 after Buchanan was appointed to the Senate of Canada and until the party selected Donald W. Cameron as party leader and premier. During his term, Cameron reformed government finance practices, promoted anti-discrimination measures, introduced new government accountability measures and established the first non-partisan electoral boundaries revision commission in 1992.

The party in recent years
After six years of Liberal governments led by John Savage and later Russel MacLellan, PC leader John Hamm was elected premier in 1999. After taking office, he invested more in education and health care. implemented some tax cuts and sold or closed government-owned industries such as Sydney Steel. His government also passed tough lobbyist registration legislation, introduced smoking cessation initiatives, provided new funding for community college modernization and achieved historically high economic growth and employment numbers. His government was the first to truly balance provincial finances in 25 years in 2002.Rodney MacDonald took the party reins from Hamm in 2006 and subsequently became Premier of Nova Scotia. Through strategic investments in rural broadband infrastructure, MacDonald continued to expand high-speed internet access throughout the province. MacDonald's government moved to help stabilize energy costs, grow the economy and attract new investment to the province.

The 2006 election resulted in a reduced minority for MacDonald and the Progressive Conservatives were reduced to third-party status in the 2009 election. On June 24, 2009, MacDonald stepped down as leader and Karen Casey was named the interim leader.

As the only candidate in the leadership election, Jamie Baillie became leader of the PC Party on October 30, 2010. He led the party into the 2013 election, and won eleven seats to form the Official Opposition. In the 2017 election, the party retained official opposition status, and increased their seat count to 17.

On November 1, 2017, Baillie announced he was stepping down as leader. Baillie was to remain in the position until a new leader was chosen, however on January 24, 2018, he resigned after the party executive requested his immediate resignation due to "allegations of inappropriate behaviour". Following his resignation, Pictou West MLA Karla MacFarlane was named interim leader.

The party president is David Bond. The party also has a recognized youth wing called the Nova Scotia Young Progressive Conservative Association whose president is Scott Ellis.

In the 2021 Nova Scotia general election, the Progressive Conservative party won a majority government for the first time since 1999 and formed government for the first time since 2006.

Values and mission
According to the PC Party website, their mission is "to form a fiscally responsible, socially progressive government that promotes individual achievement and personal responsibility, is accountable to its citizens, listens to its people, embraces innovation, preserves the best of our unique heritage and diverse cultures and learns from the past".

The Progressive Conservative Party of Nova Scotia and the Conservative Party of Canada are two separate entities.

Current elected members

Party leaders

 James William Johnston (1843–1864)
 Charles Tupper (1864–1867)
 Hiram Blanchard (1867–1874)
 Simon Hugh Holmes (1874–1882)
 John Sparrow David Thompson (1882)
 Adam Carr Bell (1882–1887)
 William McKay (1887–1890)
 Charles Cahan (1890–1894)
 William McKay (1894–1897)
 John Fitzwilliam Stairs (1897–1904)
 Charles Wilcox (1898–1901) (house leader)
 Charles E. Tanner (1901–1908) (house leader)
 Charles Wilcox (1908–1909) (house leader)
 John M. Baillie (1909–1912) (house leader)
 Charles E. Tanner (1912–1922)
 W.L. Hall (1922–1925)
 Edgar Nelson Rhodes (1925–1930)
 Gordon Sidney Harrington (1930–1937)
 Percy C. Black (1937–1940)
 Leonard William Fraser (1940–1948)
 Fred M. Blois (1940–1945) (house leader)
 Robert Stanfield (1948–1967)
 G.I. Smith (1967–1971)
 John Buchanan (1971–1990)
 Roger Stuart Bacon (1990–1991) (interim)
 Donald W. Cameron (1991–1993)
 Terry Donahoe (1993–1995) (interim)
 John Hamm (1995–2006)
 Rodney MacDonald (2006–2009)
 Karen Casey (2009–2010) (interim)
 Jamie Baillie (2010–2018)
 Karla MacFarlane (2018) (interim)
 Tim Houston (2018–present)

Election results

See also
List of premiers of Nova Scotia
List of political parties in Canada
Progressive Conservative Association of Nova Scotia leadership elections

References

Provincial political parties in Nova Scotia
Conservative parties in Canada
1867 establishments in Nova Scotia
Political parties established in 1867